The VR Class Hr11 was the first class of line-haul diesel locomotives used by Valtionrautatiet (Finnish State Railways). Only five units were built, all delivered by Valmet in 1955. The Maybach diesel engines used in the locomotives proved highly unreliable, resulting in a complete overhaul of the engine-transmission system in 1956–58, but this did not solve all of the reliability problems. The Hr11 series was withdrawn from service in 1972.

History
VR (Finnish Railways) started a modernization project in the early fifties. VR had a small amount of diesel and gasoline-powered railcars since the 1920s, but in 1952 VR had only steam locomotives.

Modern aluminum-carriage diesel powered express multiple units (Dm3 and Dm4) were introduced in 1952.
Related to these orders, VR ordered in 1952 five passenger train diesel locomotives with hydraulic transmission from Valmet Oy, Tampere. The locomotives were delivered in 1955.

Technology
The locomotives had originally two six-cylinder Maybach MD320 diesel engines driving each their own Maybach Mekydro K64B hydraulic-mechanical gearbox. The engines and transmission were placed in the bogies. The engine-transmission units proved to be very unreliable, and in 1956–58 a complete overhaul was done. Among other improvements, the engines were fitted with turbochargers, which increased the power from 450 hp to 600 hp, but simultaneously lowered the RPM from 1700 to 1500 r/min. The new engine designation was Maybach MD325. The gearboxes were changed to another type, Mekydro KL64. After the upgrade, the engines were reasonably reliable, but the reliability of the Maybach Mekydros did not improve significantly.

Operation
The locomotives carried a gray livery, with wine-red broad stripes. The gray color and sleek looks earned it the nickname Lentävä susi (Flying Wolf).
They pulled mainly passenger trains between Tampere, Helsinki and Turku.
All units were abandoned in 1972.

Preservation

No 1950 is stored at the Finnish Railway Museum.

See also 
 Finnish Railway Museum
 VR Group
 List of Finnish locomotives
 List of railway museums Worldwide
 Heritage railways
 List of heritage railways
 Restored trains
 Jokioinen Museum Railway
 History of rail transport in Finland

References

External links

Finnish Railway Museum
Steam Locomotives in Finland Including the Finnish Railway Museum

Hr11
Hr11
Hr11
Railway locomotives introduced in 1955
5 ft gauge locomotives